Maria Paz Paterno Madrigal (May 4, 1915 – September 12, 2008), commonly known as Pacita Madrigal-Warns (from 1945 to 1956), later Pacita Warns Gonzales (from 1956 until her death), was a Filipina ballet dancer, former beauty queen, and politician. She served as the administrator of the Social Welfare Administration under Ramon Magsaysay's cabinet from 1953 to 1955 and was a Senator of the Philippines from 1955 to 1961 during the Third and Fourth Congresses. She was the second woman to be elected to the Philippine Senate.

Early life and education
Maria Paz Paterno Madrigal was born on May 4, 1915 to Vicente Madrigal López of Albay, a Filipino-Spanish business tycoon and senator from 1945 to 1953 and Susana Ramos Paterno of Laguna. Second of seven siblings, Maria Paz, or Pacita, grew up in San Miguel, Manila.

Pacita studied in Philippine Women's University and became Colegio de San Juan de Letran's Princess of Education at the age of fifteen. She graduated class valedictorian in the same school, and later entered Sorbonne University in Paris. She took business administration degree at the University of Santo Tomas where she graduated magna cum laude. She also took finishing courses at the Le Collège Féminin de Bouffemont in France, and at Dale Carnegie Course and Powers School in New York.

In 1934, she joined the Manila Carnival (equivalent to today's Binibining Pilipinas) under the sponsorship of Dee Tees, the country's leading publication during that era. She was defeated by Clarita Tankiang, a Chinese mestiza, for the crown.

In 1941, Pacita was in New York when the Second World War reached the Philippines. During that time, Pacita enlisted as a volunteer nurse for the Red Cross and Walter Reed Army Medical Center.

Political career 
After the war, Pacita married Herman Warns, an executive of the Manila Gas Corporation. In 1952, she represented the League of Women Voters, the Triennial Congress of International Allience of Women in Naples, Italy and UNESCO Seventh General Conference in Geneva. From 1945 to 1953, Pacita managed her husband's ballet school. Later that year, she gave up the administration of their school to head the Women for Magsaysay Movement (WMPM), which supported the candidacy of the then Ramon Magsaysay for presidency. Upon his assumption of office, Magsaysay appointed Madrigal-Warns as the chief of the Social Welfare Administration (SWA) in 1953. Later, she re-structured the organization of WMPM from a civic organization to a social welfare society. She also established the Samahang Manang Pacita (Manang Pacita Movement) which focused on community development.

In 1955, she decided to run for the Senate under the Nacionalista banner, where she obtained the topnotch slot garnering a total vote of 2,544,716, or 50.4% of the total vote turnouts. Madrigal-Warns became the second female senator of the Philippines after Geronima Pecson. During her term, she was the chairperson of the Senate Committee on Social Justice. Community Development and Welfare. She was also the lone woman in the upper house during the 3rd (1954–1957) and 4th Congresses (1958–1961).

In 1956, Pacita married Gonzalo Wilfrado Gonzales, a lawyer, after the death of Herman Warns. She unsuccessfully bid for re-election in 1961, ended up being 11th, which was said to be due to the accusations of her public funds misuse in 1956.

Post-political career 
Pacita-Gonzales was charged with malversation, misappropriation and misuse of public funds of the Social Welfare Administration during the years of 1954–1955, which was later dismissed by the Supreme Court in 1963.

Personal life 
Pacita Madrigal was married to Herman Warns from 1945 until his death in 1956. They had one issue, Vicente Madrigal Warns, known as "Bu Madrigal".

At the death of Warns, Pacita married lawyer Gonzalo Wilfrado Rafols Gonzales, son of Bienvenido Ma. Gonzales, an educator and president of the University of the Philippines from 1939 to 1943 and 1945–1951. They had one issue, Ana Maria Gizela Madrigal Gonzales.

Pacita is the aunt of Jamby Madrigal, who also served as senator from 2004 to 2010.

She died on September 12, 2008.

Legacy 
 Pacita Madrigal Warns - Mababang Paaralan ng Bagong Silang (Calatagan, Batangas)

References 

1915 births
2008 deaths
Senators of the 3rd Congress of the Philippines
Senators of the 4th Congress of the Philippines
Philippine Women's University alumni
University of Paris alumni
University of Santo Tomas alumni
Filipino people of Spanish descent
People from San Miguel, Manila
Filipino ballerinas
Secretaries of Social Welfare and Development of the Philippines
Magsaysay administration cabinet members
Nacionalista Party politicians
Women members of the Senate of the Philippines